The 2015 European Superstock 600 Championship was the eleventh season of the European Superstock 600 Championship, a support class to the Superbike World Championship at its European rounds. The championship used 600 cc production motorcycles and was reserved for riders between 15 and 24 years of age. The 2015 season was contested over eight races at seven meetings, beginning at Motorland Aragón on 11 April and ending at Circuit de Nevers Magny-Cours on 3 October.

With five victories and a third place in the first six races, Toprak Razgatlıoğlu of Turkey secured the championship title with two races to spare. He led the season's only other winners, Italy's Michael Ruben Rinaldi, by 59 points, Federico Caricasulo – also from Italy – a further 12 points behind in third, and Augusto Fernández from Spain, a further 6 points behind in fourth.

Race calendar and results

Championship standings

Entry list

References

External links

European Superstock 600 Championship seasons
European Superstock 600 Championship
Superstock 600 Championship